Kolton Daniel Miller (born October 9, 1995) is an American football offensive tackle for the Las Vegas Raiders of the National Football League (NFL). He played college football at UCLA.

College career
After redshirting in 2014, Miller made his first career start at UCLA in 2015 after Conor McDermott was injured against California. Miller took over as starting tackle for UCLA from that game on. He later started the first five games of the 2016 season, but was injured against Arizona and was out for the rest of the season.  After the 2017 season, Miller announced that he would declare for the 2018 NFL Draft.

Professional career
At the NFL combine, Miller set a combine record for an offensive lineman with a 10'1" broad jump.

Miller was drafted by the Oakland Raiders with the 15th overall pick in the first round of the 2018 NFL Draft. On May 18, 2018, Miller signed a four-year rookie deal. He was named the Raiders starting left tackle to start the 2018 season, beating out veteran Donald Penn, who was moved to right tackle. In Week 5 against the Los Angeles Chargers, Miller allowed 3 sacks on quarterback Derek Carr in a 26–10 loss.
In week 6 against the Seattle Seahawks, Miller allowed another three sacks on Carr.  In Week 8 against the Indianapolis Colts, Miller and the offensive line bounced back and did not allow a single sack in the game.

Despite the signing of veteran Trent Brown, head coach Jon Gruden announced that Miller would remain at left tackle with Brown moving to right.

Miller was placed on the reserve/COVID-19 list by the team on October 22, 2020, and was activated two days later.

On April 2, 2021, Miller signed a three-year, $54.015 million contract extension with $42.6 million guaranteed with the Raiders, keeping him under contract through the 2025 season.

References

External links
UCLA Bruins profile
Las Vegas Raiders bio

1995 births
Living people
Sportspeople from Roseville, California
Players of American football from California
American football offensive tackles
UCLA Bruins football players
Las Vegas Raiders players
Oakland Raiders players
People from Redwood City, California